J. David Walker Field at Legacy Park is a baseball venue in Bethlehem, Pennsylvania, United States. It is home to the Lehigh Mountain Hawks baseball team of the NCAA Division I Patriot League. It features batting cages, bullpens, a natural grass surface, and an electronic scoreboard.

See also 
 List of NCAA Division I baseball venues

References 

College baseball venues in the United States
Baseball venues in Pennsylvania
Lehigh Mountain Hawks baseball
2015 establishments in Pennsylvania
Sports venues completed in 2015